The 1992 Clemson Tigers football team played for Clemson University during the 1992 NCAA Division I-A football season. At the time, the comeback against Virginia was the largest comeback margin in school history.

Schedule

Roster

References

Clemson
Clemson Tigers football seasons
Clemson Tigers football